Eshete is a surname. Notable people with the surname include:

Alemayehu Eshete (1941–2021), Ethiopian singer and musician
Jade Eshete (born 1985), American actress
Shitaye Eshete (born 1990), Ethiopian-born Bahraini long-distance runner
Tessema Eshete (1876–1964), Ethiopian musician

Amharic-language names